Karl Kraus may refer to:
Karl Kraus (writer) (1874–1936), Austrian writer and journalist
Karl Kraus (physicist) (1938–1988), German theoretical physicist

See also
Karl Christian Friedrich Krause (1781–1832), German philosopher
Karl Friedrich Theodor Krause (1797–1868), German anatomist
Karl Wilhelm Krause (1911–2001), Waffen-SS officer